Erich Gülzow (29 March 1888 – 16 August 1954) was a German local historian, philologist and publisher. He wrote books on the history of Vorpommern and Rügen island. Through his publications on Ernst Moritz Arndt he became known beyond the borders of Pomerania.

Life 
Gülzow was born in Loitz in 1888 as the son of the local teacher and chronicler Christian Gülzow (1856–1934) and his wife Marie. After attending the  he pursued German studies, Romance studies and theology at the universities of Freiburg, Grenoble and Greifswald. For his dissertation about Heinrich von dem Türlin, he was honoured with the title of doctor in 1913. After passing the examination for the higher-level teaching qualification in 1914, he moved to Barth. At the secondary school there he was active from 1919 as Studienrat.

During this time he turned his attention to the history of Vorpommern and began to publish numerous writings and essays as an author and editor. He initiated the series "Barther Heimatbücherei" and in 1922 edited the 800-page "Chronik der Stadt Barth" by the late Wilhelm Bülow and published it. From 1935 to 1939 he published the series "Grimmener Heimatbücherei".

In the 1930s he focused his historical research on Ernst Moritz Arndt, about whose estate he had built up a collection since the 1920s. He participated in a historical-critical complete edition of Arndt's work, which was supported by the German Research Foundation and the universities of Greifswald and Bonn. In 1941 he retired early in order to devote himself better to this task. After the project leader Paul Hermann Ruth, who died in the Second World War, was called up, Gülzow took over the overall management. He did valuable detailed work in researching Arndt's life and work, but also put himself at the service of National Socialism.

After the end of the war, numerous research materials on Ernst Moritz Arndt were lost or destroyed. In October 1948 Gülzow made an attempt to re-establish the Arndt society, but was ultimately unsuccessful.

Gülzow died in Barth at age 66.

Publications 
 Zur Stilkunde der Krone Heinrichs von dem Türlin., Leipzig 1914
 Barth vor 125 Jahren.  Barth 1920
 Ernst Moritz Arndt in Schweden. Greifswald 1920 
 Vom Barther Schulwesen in früheren Tagen. Barth 1921
 Ernst Moritz Arndt und Stralsund. Stralsund 1922
 Menschen und Bilder aus Pommerns Vergangenheit. Stralsund 1928
 Loitzer. Waberg, Grimmen 1939
 Gottlieb Mohnike

Further reading 
 Rembert Unterstell: "Lokalgeschichte zwischen Heimathistorie und Politik. Der pommersche Geschichtsschreiber und historische Publizist Erich Gülzow (1888–1954)". In Berichte und Forschungen. Jahrbuch des Bundesinstituts für ostdeutsche Kultur und Geschichte. Volume 4, 1996,

References

External links 
 
 

German philologists
Grenoble Alpes University alumni
20th-century German historians
German editors
1888 births
1954 deaths
People from Loitz
University of Freiburg alumni
Local historians
People from Barth, Germany
University of Greifswald alumni
German expatriates in France
20th-century philologists